Drosera purpurascens is a compact tuberous perennial species in the genus Drosera that is endemic to south-west Western Australia. It produces 1 erect or 2 to 5 semi-erect lateral stems that grow to 3 to 10 cm long. The compact size of the plant combined with relatively long petioles distinguish it from all other members of the section Stolonifera. It is native to a region from Mount Cooke to near Katanning and Ongerup south to the Denmark-Albany region. It grows in sand-laterite soils and flowers from July to October, flowering en masse after bushfires.

It was first formally described by August Friedrich Schlotthauber in 1856. In 1982 N. G. Marchant described a subspecies of D. stolonifera that was later reduced to synonymy with D. purpurascens.

See also 
List of Drosera species

References

External links 

Carnivorous plants of Australia
Caryophyllales of Australia
Eudicots of Western Australia
Plants described in 1856
purpurascens